The General Tire 100 is a 101.1-mile (162.7-km) ARCA Menards Series race held on the Daytona International Speedway road course.

History
The inaugural race was added to the series schedule in mid-2020 as a companion weekend with all three NASCAR national series. The midseason schedule shift came as a result of the COVID-19 pandemic. The 2020 edition of the race was delayed from an afternoon race to a night race because of inclement weather.

List of winners

References

ARCA Menards Series races
2020 establishments in Florida
Motorsport in Daytona Beach, Florida
August sporting events